Mohawk Valley School District 17 is a school district in Yuma County, Arizona. It has one elementary school, the historic Mohawk Valley School, which is located on 5151 South Ave. 39 East in Roll. The school was listed in the National Register of Historic Places on December 29, 1986, reference: #86003525.

References

External links
 

School districts in Yuma County, Arizona